Ahmed Abdulahi Waayeel (died 3 December 2009) was a Somali politician and a minister in the Transitional Federal Government.

He was killed, along with Minister of Health Qamar Aden Ali and Minister of Higher Education Ibrahim Hassan Addow, in a suicide bombing at the Hotel Shamo in Mogadishu, the capital of Somalia, on 3 December 2009. At the time, he was Minister of Education.

References

                   

2009 deaths
2009 murders in Somalia
Year of birth missing
Deaths by suicide bomber
Terrorism deaths in Somalia
Assassinated Somalian politicians
Government ministers of Somalia